Eutudora jimenoi is a species of an operculate land snail, terrestrial gastropod mollusk in the family Pomatiidae.

Distribution 
This species lives in Cuba.

Ecology 
Eutudora jimenoi is a rock dwelling species.

Predators of Eutudora jimenoi include larvae of firefly bug Alecton discoidalis.

References

Pomatiidae
Gastropods described in 1864
Endemic fauna of Cuba